Tai Hau Wan or Taihowan is a place name in Hong Kong:

A former name of Telegraph Bay
Sandy Bay, Hong Kong, a place north of Telegraph Bay
Tai Ho Wan, a bay on the north shore of Lantau Island

See also
 Tai Ho (disambiguation)